Faversham  is a market town in Kent, England,  from Sittingbourne,  from London and  from Canterbury, next to the Swale, a strip of sea separating mainland Kent from the Isle of Sheppey in the Thames Estuary. It is close to the A2, which follows an ancient British trackway which was used by the Romans and the Anglo-Saxons, and known as Watling Street. The name is of Old English origin, meaning "the metal-worker's village".

There has been a settlement at Faversham since pre-Roman times, next to the ancient sea port on Faversham Creek. It was inhabited by the Saxons and mentioned in the Domesday Book of 1086 as Favreshant. The town was favoured by King Stephen who established Faversham Abbey, which survived until the Dissolution of the Monasteries in 1538. Subsequently, the town became an important seaport and established itself as a centre for brewing, and the Shepherd Neame Brewery, founded in 1698, remains a significant major employer.

The town was also the centre of the explosives industry between the 17th and early 20th century, before a decline following an accident in 1916 which killed over 100 workers. This coincided with a revival of the shipping industry in the town. Faversham has a number of landmarks, with several historic churches including St Mary of Charity, Faversham Parish Church, the Maison Dieu and Faversham Recreation Ground. Faversham Market has been established for over 900 years and is still based in the town centre. There are good road and rail links, including a Southeastern service to the High Speed 1 line at Ebbsfleet International and London.

Name
The name Faversham, first attested in 811 as Fefresham, derives from Old English. The second element is the Old English word hām ('settlement'), which is common in place-names. The first element, however, is unique. It has been inferred to derive from an otherwise lost Old English word *fæfere ('smith'), which in turn derived from the Latin faber ('craftsman, smith'). Thus the name once meant 'smith's homestead'. Given its Latin derivation, however, the name may have referred specifically to Roman smiths.

History

Early history
Faversham was established as a settlement before the Roman conquest. The Romans established several towns in Kent including Faversham, with traffic through the Saxon Shore ports of Reculver, Richborough, Dover and Lympne converging on Canterbury before heading up Watling Street to London. Numerous remains of Roman buildings have been discovered in and around Faversham, including under St Mary of Charity Church where coins and urns were discovered during reconstruction of the western tower in 1794. In 2013, the remains of a 2,000-year-old Roman theatre, able to accommodate some 12,000 people, were discovered at a hillside near the town. The cockpit-style outdoor auditorium, the first of its kind found in Britain, was a style the Romans used elsewhere in their empire on the Continent.

There is archaeological evidence to suggest that Faversham was a summer capital for the Saxon kings of Kent. It was held in royal demesne in 811, and is further cited in a charter granted by Coenwulf, the King of Mercia. Coenwulf described the town as 'the King's little town of Fefresham', while it was recorded in the Domesday Book as Favreshant. The town had established itself as a seaport by the Middle Ages, and became part of the Confederation of the Cinque Ports in the 13th century, providing a vessel to Dover. The Gough Map of Britain, printed in 1360, shows the Swale as an important shipping channel for trade.

Middle Ages

The manor was recorded as Terra Regis, meaning it was part of the ancient royal estates. King Stephen gave it to his chief lieutenant, William of Ypres, but soon made him swap it with Lillechurch (now Higham) so that the manor of Faversham could form part of the endowment of Faversham Abbey. Stephen established the abbey in 1148, and is buried there with his consort Matilda of Boulogne, and his son, Eustace, the Earl of Boulogne. Stephen favoured the town because of the abbey, and so it was historically important during his reign. King John tried to give the church to Simon of Wells in 1201, but it was owned by the monks of St Augustine's Abbey at Canterbury, who appealed to Rome and denied the request. Abbey Street was constructed around this time in order to provide an appropriate approach to the abbey from the town. It still houses timber-framed buildings and has been described as "the finest medieval street in southeast England".

Thomas Culpeper was granted Faversham Abbey by Henry VIII during the Dissolution of the Monasteries in 1538. Most of the abbey was demolished, and the remains of Stephen were rumoured to have been thrown into Faversham Creek. An excavation of the abbey in 1964 uncovered the empty graves. The entrance gates survived the demolition and lasted until the mid-18th century, but otherwise only a small section of outer wall survived. The abbey's masonry was taken to Calais to reinforce defence of the town, then in British possession, against the French army. In 1539, the ground upon which the abbey had stood, along with nearby land, passed to Sir Thomas Cheney, Lord Warden of the Cinque Ports.

Among the few surviving buildings of Faversham Abbey are the two barns at Abbey Farm. Minor Barn was built around 1425, its construction was overseen by the Right Honourable George Wall, a member of the notable Wall Family; Major Barn, the larger of the two, dates from 1476. Next to the barns is the Abbey Farmhouse, part of which dates from the 14th century. The Abbey Guest house, on the east side of the Abbey's Outer Gateway, has survived as Arden's House. This house, now a private residence in Abbey Street, was the location of the murder of Thomas Arden in 1551. The Faversham Almshouses were founded and endowed by Thomas Manfield in 1614, with additional houses being built by Henry Wright in 1823.

Due to the poor quality of roads in the Middle Ages, travel by sea was an important transport corridor. Richard Tylman (or Tillman), mayor in 1581, expanded the port at Faversham, building two wharfs. He became a key figure in exporting corn, wheat and malt to London from the town.

Several notable people in the Middle Ages had origins in Faversham. Haymo of Faversham was born in Faversham and later moved to Paris to join the Franciscans, becoming the "Aristotelian of Aristotelians". Simon of Faversham was born in the town around the middle of the 13th century and later became Chancellor of the University of Oxford in 1304. The notorious pirate Jack Ward is believed to have been born in Faversham around 1553. John Wilson, lutenist and teacher was born in Faversham in 1595 who was the principal composer for the King's Men and a professor of music at Oxford. There is now a plaque at the site of the house in Abbey Street where he was born.

Explosives industry

A gunpowder plant had been established around 1573 in Faversham. The town had a stream which could be dammed at intervals to provide power for watermills. It became known as the Home Works in the 18th century and was nationalised in 1759. By the 19th century, the site stretched for around a mile along the waterfront. A second explosive works was established at Oare to the northwest of town in the late 17th century, with the Marsh Works following in 1786. Towards the end of the 19th century, two new factories were built alongside the Swale to manage production of TNT and cordite. Faversham developed six explosive factories, and from 1874 to 1919, the town was the centre of the explosives industry in the UK.

The first production of guncotton took place in the Marsh Works in 1847. Due to a lack of experience with production methods, an explosion took place soon after work started, with several fatalities.  On Sunday 2 April 1916, an explosion occurred at one of the Swale factories in Uplees after sparks from a chimney ignited the works containing around 150 tonnes of high explosives. The incident killed over 100 people, which led to decline of the explosives industry in the town. Later accounts suggested that had the incident not happened on a Sunday, there would have been many more casualties.

All three gunpowder factories closed in 1934 due to the impending threat of World War II. Production was moved to Ardeer in Ayrshire, Scotland, and the munition industry around Faversham is now extinct. The town is now a harbour and market community; old sail-powered Thames barges are repaired, rebuilt and moored along the creekside.

Industrial Revolution and beyond

Kent is the centre of hop-growing in England, being centred on nearby Canterbury and Faversham has been the home of several breweries. The Shepherd Neame Brewery was officially founded in 1698, though brewing activities in Faversham pre-date this. The brewery claims to be the oldest in Britain and continues to be family-owned. The Rigden brewery was founded in the early 18th century by Edward Rigden. It subsequently merged with the Canterbury-based George Beer in 1922 to become George Beer & Rigden before being purchased by the Maidstone based Fremlin's. Whitbread bought out Fremlin's in 1967, and closed the Faversham brewery in 1990. The site is now a Tesco superstore. Shepherd Neame remains a significant regional brewer despite a decline in consumption of traditional bitter beer, producing around 230,000 barrels a year. It now also makes India Pale Ale under licence. Lieutenant-General Sir Philip Neame, recipient of the Victoria Cross, was born in Faversham and a memorial to him was placed in the town centre in 2014.

A shipyard was established in Faversham by James Pollock & Sons (Shipbuilders) in 1916 at the request of Lord Fisher, the First Lord of The Admiralty, for manufacturing barges for landing craft. Faversham already had a tradition of shipbuilding, and it soon became a major contributor to markets throughout the world, producing vessels such as the Molliette and the Violette, both constructed of concrete. Over 1200 ships were built and launched from Faversham between 1916 and 1969.

Faversham Market is still held in the town centre. It is now the oldest street market in Kent, dating back over 900 years. Monthly markets are also held in Preston Street and Court Street.

Having been an important thoroughfare since the 12th century, Abbey Street went into decline around the start of the 20th. Some buildings on the street adjoining Quay Lane were demolished in 1892 and much of the entire street was intended for demolition as recently as the 1950s, until intervention from the Society for the Protection of Ancient Buildings. Local people began a determined fight to restore and preserve the area.

Archaeology 
In May 2019, the Kent Archaeological Field School uncovered a 150 ft-long by 50 ft-wide Roman building at Abbey Farm. According to Dr Paul Wilkinson, the building contained broken stone walls covering huge amounts of box flue tiles, which were used to direct hot air up the indoor walls, glazed terracotta floors, an untouched underfloor with hypocaust heating, and tons of ceramic roof tiles. Although the plaster painted from these walls was mostly white, plaster walls coloured with green, red and yellow panels were found in the hot sauna room on the north side of the building.

In 2009 Faversham Community Archaeology Research Group uncovered evidence of the town's medieval tannery in the back gardens of Tanner Street. Evidence of Anglo-Saxon occupation was discovered during the Hunt the Saxons project between 2005 and 2007 and a high-status rubbish pit excavated in the "Searching for the Kings Manor" project in 2017-2019.

Government

A charter was granted to the Mayor of Faversham, Jurats and Freemen of the Town of Faversham in 1546, and regranted 1685; the town council was established under the Municipal Corporations Act 1835. The parliamentary constituency of Faversham was created for the 1885 general election and replaced by the new constituencies of Sittingbourne and Sheppey and Faversham and Mid Kent at the 1997 general election. The town has been represented by a Member of Parliament from the Conservative Party other than between 1945 and 1970. Since 2015, the constituency's MP has been Conservative Helen Whately.

Faversham is within the Swale local government district. The town contains the four electoral wards of Abbey, Davington Priory, St Ann's and Watling.

Faversham was a large ancient parish, which included rural areas and surrounding villages.  It became a civil parish in 1866, but in 1894 was divided into Faversham Within and Faversham Without.  In 1935 the civil parish of Faversham was recreated and absorbed the civil parishes of Faversham Within, Davington, Preston Within, North Preston Without and South Preston Without, and parts of the civil parishes of Faversham Without, Luddenham and Ospringe (including the village of Ospringe).

The Arms of Faversham Town Council, which holds its meetings at Faversham Guildhall, is based on the Royal Arms of England, alluding to the town's regal history.

Geography
Faversham is roughly equidistant between Sittingbourne and Canterbury. Nearby villages include Oare across Oare Creek to the north, Luddenham, Mockbeggar and Ospringe.

Geographically, Faversham sits at a boundary between marshland to the north and a mixture of brick earth, gravel and chalk to the south which leads into the North Downs. Faversham Creek connects the town to the Swale that separates mainland Kent from the Isle of Sheppey. The surrounding area is part of the South Swale Nature Reserve, popular with wildfowl and wading birds. The coastline around Faversham is a by-product of the changes to sea level around Britain since the end of the last ice age. During Roman Britain and into the first millennium, the Faversham coast was a large estuary with Oare and Graveney being peninsulas. Land reclamation during the Middle Ages, which closed the River Wantsum and connected the Isle of Thanet to mainland Kent, resulted in less tidal waters reaching Faversham. To stop the creek silting up completely and making navigation impossible, a number of sluices have been installed since the 16th century.

This was the first time the recorded temperature had ever exceeded  reliably in the UK. This record had stood for nearly 16 years, but was beaten by 0.2 °C (0.4 °F) with a temperature of  recorded in the Cambridge University Botanic Garden on 25 July 2019. Faversham still holds the record for the highest maximum temperature in the UK for August with the previous record in 2003.

At the 2011 UK census, Faversham had a population of 19,316, an increase of 1,606 from the 2001 census. The population figures were split into Abbey (6,084), Davington Priory (2,593), St Ann's (5,268) and Watling (5,371). 9,770 people were employed within the town, split into retail (1,416), education (1,239), health and social work (1,200), construction (836) and manufacturing (692). 17,868 of the town's residents were born in England.

Culture

Arden of Feversham is a play about the murder of Thomas Arden written around 1590, possibly by William Shakespeare or Canterbury-born Christopher Marlowe. It gives its name to the modern Arden Theatre in the town, Local theatre groups perform in the theatre as part of the Canterbury Festival each autumn.

The Royal Cinema is based near the town square. It opened in 1936 and is now Grade II listed. It is one of only two mock Tudor cinemas to survive in the UK.

The Faversham Society was established in 1962, and is one of the oldest civic societies in the UK. It owns and manages the Fleur de Lis Heritage Centre as its headquarters. The Centre hosts a large museum depicting the town's history and culture and hosts the town's Visitor Information Centre, including a bookshop.

The Maison Dieu ('House of God'), located on the A2 to the southwest of the town centre, is a hospital, monastery, hostel, retirement home and Royal lodge commissioned by Henry III in 1234 and now in the care of English Heritage. It is now managed by the Maison Dieu Trust and closely associated to the Faversham Society as a museum of Roman artefacts from the surrounding area.

Davington Priory lies to the northwest of the town centre and was founded in the mid 12th century. It is currently owned and occupied by musician and activist Bob Geldof.

Brogdale Farm, to the south of the town centre, has hosted the DEFRA National Fruit Collection since 1954. The farm hosts a number of fruit festivals throughout the year, guided tours and activities for schools. It also hosts the 9-inch Faversham miniature railway which runs through the orchards.

In 2011 it was discovered that the town owns an original version of Magna Carta, potentially worth about £20m, rather than a copy worth only £10,000. In 2015, the copy went on display to the public at the town's Alexander Centre – the first time it had been on display for 715 years.

The 2021 Tamil Film Jagame Thandhiram starring Dhanush was partly filmed in Faversham, including the Iron Wharf.

Community facilities

Faversham Recreation Ground (locally known as Faversham Rec, or simply The Rec) is to the east of the town centre. It was established in 1860 by a local solicitor, Henry Wreight, who bequeathed his £70,000 estate, including two almshouses housing 70 people, to the town in order that locals would have an area to enjoy. The rec has been preserved and is now run by the town's Municipal Charities. A bandstand was added towards the end of the 19th century, and sporting events began to be held on the rec. A week-long party was held to celebrate the Coronation of Queen Elizabeth II in 1953, which drew praise from Princess Andrei of Russia, then living near Faversham. A 50-year extension on the lease, signed in 2010, confirmed its continued use by the public.

The Oare Gunpowder Works, scene of the 1916 explosion, is now a country park and nature reserve open to the public free of charge. The Oare Marshes are an important reserve for birds. There is an information centre near the site of the former Harty ferry over the Swale to the Isle of Sheppey. Remains of the process houses and other mill leats have been conserved, and various trails are signposted. An early 20th century electric-powered gunpowder mill which was transferred to Ardeer in 1934 has been repatriated to the country park and is on display. The 18th-century works bell has also been repatriated and is on display at Faversham's Fleur de Lis Heritage Centre. Stonebridge Pond, on the site of the original Chart Mills, was donated to Swale Borough Council in the early 1980s. It is now a haven for wading birds.

Landmarks

Faversham Stone Chapel (in Norton, Buckland and Stone) is the remains of the Church of Our Lady of Elwarton, an ancient monument managed by The Faversham Society. It was originally used for pagan rituals in pre-Roman Britain, and is the only remaining evidence in Britain of a church incorporating a pagan shrine. The building was converted into a church around AD601 when Pope Gregory I encouraged pagan buildings to be converted rather than destroyed. The church has not seen service since the 16th century and was reported as "being in a state of disrepair" and unused since the Reformation.

Although Faversham Abbey was dissolved by Henry VIII the nearby St Mary of Charity, Faversham Parish Church remains, and has been a Grade I listed building since 1950. The church was established in 1147 by King Stephen and Queen Matilda, with a distinctive spire added around 1794 – 97 that can be easily seen from many places around the town. The interior was restored in the mid-19th century by the architect Sir George Gilbert Scott, who redesigned the nave and transepts and added a stone encasing to the spire. The church reputedly contains the remains of King Stephen, which were recovered from Faversham Creek after the dissolution of the abbey. The church holds an altar dedicated to Saints Crispin and Crispinian, who reportedly fled to Faversham in the 3rd century.

St Catherine's Church dates from the Norman period and was extensively restored in the 1860s. The nearby Ospringe Church, to the southwest of town, dates from Norman Britain, aside from a replacement tower built in 1866. The National Shrine of Saint Jude is a Roman Catholic shrine in the Church of Our Lady of Mount Carmel. It was established in 1955 and regularly attracts Catholic pilgrims.

The Grade II listed St John the Evangelist church on Upper Brents was built in 1881 by Kirk and Son of Sleaford, It was founded by Mrs Hall of Syndale House, Faversham, the widow of a gunpowder manufacturer.

The historic central area, especially the part-pedestrian parts between the station and the creek, attracts visitors, who can learn about the town's history and features at the Fleur-de-Lis centre, which provides tourist information and houses a museum. There is still a regular market several days each week in the market square where the Guildhall stands.  Nearby streets feature old pubs, almshouses, shops and a growing collection of art galleries and restaurants.

Faversham Cottage Hospital opened in 1887. It was extended in 1922 and included a World War I memorial, which was unveiled by Vice Admiral Hugh Evan-Thomas. The memorial was later adapted to commemorate World War II casualties. In 2014, the memorial became Grade II listed.

Faversham Cemetery opened in 1898. The chapel was designed by Edwin Pover. 73 victims of the 1916 gunpowder explosion are buried in the cemetery, where they are commemorated by the Grade II* listed Faversham Munitions Explosion Memorial.  Also interred at the cemetery is the Irish novelist Kate O'Brien.

Transport

Faversham is close to the A2 road, a historically important route from London to Canterbury and the Channel ports. The Anglo-Saxons named it Wæcelinga Stræt (Watling Street) and it was marked as such by Matthew Paris in his Schema Britannie in 1250. The road continued to be an important thoroughfare, and is shown next to Faversham on Philip Symonson's map of Kent published in 1596.

The A2 road still carries traffic between Sittingbourne and Canterbury, though London bound traffic now takes the M2 motorway. The A299 Thanet Way provides access to the Isle of Thanet and the A251 Ashford Road is a local road to Ashford. The Mall is one of the main roads to the town centre from the A2. It was built in the late 18th century as a dignified approach road, and attracted development of villas along its length. 

Faversham railway station opened in 1858. It was completely rebuilt in 1898 and is listed Grade II.  A former goods shed built as part of the original railway works is also Grade II listed. Southeastern services travel to London, terminating at either Victoria or St Pancras. In the other direction, trains travel either to Dover Priory (via Canterbury East) or to Ramsgate (via Margate). Since 2009  services via High Speed 1 services have linked Faversham to Ebbsfleet International, Stratford International and London St Pancras.

The town is served by a number of buses. Arriva Southern Counties runs service 333 to Sittingbourne and Stagecoach in East Kent operates routes 3,3X,3A,3B to Canterbury, and route 666 to Ashford. Regent also runs service 638 to Whitstable and 660 to Stalisfield Green and Graveney. National Cycle Route 1 passes through the town, en route from Whitstable to Sittingbourne. Swale Borough Council have expressed concern over the lack of bus and cycle facilities in the town, when compared to road and rail, and there is a particular lack of public transport to nearby rural areas.

Education
There has been a school in Faversham since the twelfth century. Archival evidence has shown this had become a grammar school by 1420. In 1526, John Cole, chaplain to Henry VII and Henry VIII and Warden of All Souls College, Oxford, established a new grammar school on the estate of Ewell Farm. The property fell into disuse after the dissolution of the abbey, and a replacement grammar school was not established until 1587. The Wreights School, a commercial school, was founded in 1856, while a corresponding girls' school, The Gibbs School was established in 1883. The two boys' schools were amalgamated in 1920, forming Queen Elizabeth's Grammar School. The current school dates from 1967, when the boys and girls schools were merged, forming the first co-educational grammar school in Kent.

The Abbey School is a Business and Enterprise Academy formed in September 1983 by the amalgamation of the Ethelbert Road Boys School and Lady Capel School for Girls. It has over 1000 pupils and is located in the south of the town, beside the A2 London Road.

Sport
Faversham Town F.C. were formed in 1884 and compete in Division One South of the Isthmian League. They have a 2000-capacity stadium to the south of the town and are the only team besides the England national football team to wear the 3 lions badge. The King George V playing fields are all that remain of the Mount Field, which in 1876 hosted a first-class match between Kent and Hampshire County Cricket Club.

Cultural references

Author Russell Hoban repurposes Faversham as "Fathers Ham" in his 1980, post apocalyptic novel Riddley Walker.

See also
 Buckland-by-Faversham, a parish to the south-west of Faversham.
 Hazebrouck, a French town twinned with Faversham.
 South East Faversham, a new settlement proposed by the Duchy of Cornwall.

References
Citations

Sources

Further reading
The Great Explosion at Faversham by Arthur Percival
Also reprinted in  
The Faversham Gunpowder Industry and its Development, by Arthur Percival (Faversham Papers No 4)
Oare Gunpowder Works, by Wayne Cocroft (Faversham Papers No 39)
Gunpowder Manufacture at Faversham: Oare and Marsh Factories, by Edward Patterson (Faversham Papers No 42)
Faversham Gunpowder Personnel Register 1573–1840, by Raymond Godfrey & Arthur Percival (Faversham Papers No 84)
Faversham Explosives Personnel Register 1841–1934, by John Breeze (2008)

External links

Faversham Town Council website
The Faversham Website
The Faversham Society  Civic Society website with information about the Fleur de Lis Heritage Centre, Chart Gunpowder Mill and Maison Dieu
Faversham Gunpowder Mill showing burial plot and list of victims of the April 1916 explosion

 
Cinque ports
Borough of Swale
Market towns in Kent
Towns in Kent
Civil parishes in Kent